Epping Forest is a national park in Queensland, Australia, 855 km northwest of Brisbane. The park is a scientific national park so it is not open to the public.  Only scientists, rangers and volunteers may visit the park.  The park lies within the Brigalow Belt North bioregion. It is within the Drummond Basin geological basin and the Belyando River water catchment area.  The park was established to protect a species of wombat, the northern hairy-nosed wombat (Lasiorhinus krefftii) that is the world’s largest burrowing herbivore.

Restricted access is used to ensure Epping Forest remains very much undisturbed as it is the sole remaining natural habitat of the endangered Northern hairy-nosed wombat. The last census of the animal, undertaken in 2007, estimated there was a population of about 138 of the species. In the 1970s the population was estimated to have reached a low of somewhere between 20 and 30 wombats.

Most of the park is eucalypt woodland with patches of sandy soils that are used by the wombats for burrowing.

The wildlife in the park consists of 251 species of animals and 103 species of plants.

The elevation of the terrain in Epping Forest Park is 230 meters.

See also

 Protected areas of Queensland

References

National parks of Central Queensland
Protected areas established in 1971
1971 establishments in Australia